The Mennonites in Maryland maintain a small population dating back over a century. The majority of Maryland's Mennonites live in Southern Maryland or on the Eastern Shore, while smaller Mennonite communities exist in Grantsville, Baltimore, Howard County, and elsewhere scattered throughout the state.

Mennonite communities

Central Maryland

Baltimore

While Mennonites in Maryland have traditionally lived in rural areas, an increasing number are relocating to urban areas such as Baltimore. Three Mennonite congregations existed in Baltimore in 2015, including Wilkens Avenue Mennonite Church in Southwest Baltimore, North Baltimore Mennonite Church in Roland Park, and Hampden Mennonite Church in Hampden. Hampden Mennonite Church also maintains the Hampden Mennonite School; both the church and school are located on West 36th Street in the building formerly occupied by Trinity Reformed Church.

Old Order Mennonites from rural Pennsylvania and African-American horsemen in West Baltimore have come together to preserve the city's arabber tradition. Arabbers are a mercant tradition handed down over generations of African-American families. Baltimore's arabbers maintain three horse stables, while Mennonites from Pennsylvania Dutch Country provide assistance. The leader of Baltimore's Arabber Preservation Society, Daniel Van Allen, has described the relationship as "the meeting of two subcultures...They're not involved with the same big-budget, big-money economy that the modern people are." The arabbers' horses are taken to New Holland, Pennsylvania to be shod.

Ellicott City
New Life Mennonite Church (formerly Maple Grove Mennonite and First Mennonite Church of Columbia) in Ellicott City maintains a community garden called "Seeds of Life".

Southern Maryland Dutch Country
There is an Old Order Mennonite community in Loveville. The Mennonites of Loveville maintain a farmers' market/produce auction, as well as craft shops and an annual quilt auction. In nearby the nearby communities of Mechanicsville and Charlotte Hall , there is also an Amish community. The Old Order Mennonites share certain similarities with the Amish, such as use of the horse and buggy. In recent years, increasing development has threatened the Amish and Mennonite communities of Southern Maryland. 

In the late 1990s, over 100 Mennonite families lived in Southern Maryland.

Western Maryland
The town of Grantsville is home to a small Mennonite and Amish settlement known as Tomlinson's or Little Crossing, located along Braddock Road.

By 1888, four Mennonite congregations existed in Washington County; Reiff Mennonite Church, Stouffer Mennonite Church, Clear Spring Mennonite Church, and Miller Mennonite Church.

Alta Schrock, a Mennonite community activist and biology professor who was the first American Mennonite woman to earn a Ph.D., founded the Spruce Forest Artisan Village in Garrett County, Maryland.

List of Mennonite churches in Maryland
Bittinger Mennonite Church - Bittinger
Capital Christian Fellowship - Lanham
Casselman Mennonite Church - Grantsville
Clear Spring Mennonite Church - Clear Spring
Flintstone Mennonite Church - Flintstone
Gaithersburg Mennonite Church - Gaithersburg
Glade Mennonite Church - Accident
Gortner Union Church - Oakland
Goshen Mennonite Church - Laytonsville
Hampden Mennonite Church - Baltimore
Harmony Christian Fellowship - Millington
Holly Grove Mennonite Church - Westover
Hyattsville Mennonite Church - Hyattsville
Lanes Run Mennonite Church - Indian Springs
Meadow Mountain Mennonite Church - Swanton
Meadow View Mennonite Church - Hagerstown
Miller Mennonite Church - Leitersburg
Mount Olive Mennonite Church - Hagerstown
New Life Mennonite Church - Ellicott City
Oldtown Mennonite Church - Oldtown
Paradise Mennonite Church - Hagerstown
Pinesburg Mennonite Church - Williamsport
Pinto Mennonite Church - Pinto
Pondsville Mennonite Church - Smithsburg
Red Run Mennonite Church - Grantsville
Reiff Mennonite Church - Washington County
Snow Hill Mennonite Church - Snow Hill
Stouffer Mennonite Church - Washington County
Swanton Mennonite Fellowship - Swanton
Wilkens Avenue Mennonite Church - Baltimore
Yarrowsburg Mennonite Church - Knoxville
Zimmerman Mennonite Church (defunct) - Carroll County

Notable Mennonites from Maryland

JC Chasez, a singer, songwriter, dancer, record producer, and actor best known for NSYNC.
Alta Schrock, a biology professor and community activist in Western Maryland who was the first Mennonite woman in the United States to earn a Ph.D.
J. Lowell Stoltzfus, a Republican Senator, and former Minority Leader, representing Maryland's 38th Legislative District.

See also
Amish in Maryland

References

Biography
Burdge, Edsel; Horst, Samuel L. Building on the Gospel Foundation: The Mennonites of Franklin County, Pennsylvania and Washington County, Maryland, 1730-1970 (Studies in Anabaptist and Mennonite History), Scottdale PA, Herald Press, 2004.
Kepple, Bernice. Amish Mennonite Children's Home, Grantsville, Maryland, 1914-1938, [Oakland, Md.] : [B. Kepple], [2010].
Lehman, Daniel R. Mennonites of the Washington County, Maryland and Franklin County, Pennsylvania Conference, Lititz, Pa. : Publication Board of the Eastern Pennsylvania Mennonite Church and related areas, 1990.
Showalter, Roy M. Fragmentary glimpses of the history of the Mennonites of the Beaver Creek district, Washington County, Maryland, app. 1743 to app. 1845, and "Zions Meeting House," built 1792-1793, [Chambersburg, Pa.] : Washington-Franklin Mennonite Historical Committee, 1960.

External links

Goodwill Retirement Community
Holly Grove Mennonite Church
Hyattsville Mennonite Church
New Life Mennonite
North Baltimore Mennonite
Obituary for Joseph Sauder
Obituary for Walter A. Shank Sr.
Schrock's Country Store
Amish & Mennonite Community, Visit St. Mary's County